Cyclone Mountain is a summit located south of the Drummond Glacier in Banff National Park, Alberta, Canada.

A cyclone which occurred at the time of the mountain's naming accounts for the name.

See also 
 List of mountains in the Canadian Rockies

References

Three-thousanders of Alberta
Mountains of Banff National Park
Alberta's Rockies